Greg Morris (born March 4, 1992) is a professional Canadian football running back who is currently a free agent. He most recently played for the Ottawa Redblacks of the Canadian Football League (CFL). He played college football at New Mexico Military Institute. He also played junior football for the Westshore Rebels of the Canadian Junior Football League (CJFL).

Early years
Morris participated in basketball, track and football at Donald A Wilson Secondary School in Whitby, Ontario. He played running back and linebacker on the football team. He was named the school's senior athlete of the year.

Junior football career
Morris played for the Westshore Rebels of the Canadian Junior Football League from 2011 to 2012. He earned B.C. Football Conference rookie of the year honors in 2011 after rushing for 1,064 yards and eight touchdowns. He set the single-game CJFL rushing record when he ran for 405 yards and four touchdowns on 24 attempts in an October 2012 game against Kamloops. Morris finished the 2012 season with a B.C. Football Conference-leading 1,496 rushing yards and garnered CJFL All-Canadian recognition. He earned Outstanding Offensive Back and B.C. Football Conference All-Star honors in 2012 as well.

College career
Morris played in ten games for the New Mexico Military Institute Broncos in 2013, rushing for 995 yards and seven touchdowns on 151 attempts. He also caught eleven passes for 153 yards and one touchdown. He earned First Team All-WSFL accolades in 2013.

Professional career

Edmonton Eskimos
Morris was signed to the Edmonton Eskimos' practice roster on August 17, 2015. He was promoted to the active roster on September 6 and played in nine games for the team during the 2015 season. The Eskimos won the 103rd Grey Cup against the Ottawa Redblacks by a score of 26-20 on November 29, 2015. He was released by the Eskimos on August 31, 2016.

Saskatchewan Roughriders
Morris was signed to the Saskatchewan Roughriders' practice roster on September 1, 2016, and promoted to the active roster on September 3. He played in nine games with the Roughriders, including one start at running back, recording 14 carries for 112 yards and one touchdown and he also had eight catches for 77 yards. In 2017, he played in all 18 regular season games and both post-season games. He had 14 carries for 66 rushing yards and one reception for 34 yards. He saw increased time on kickoff returns, posting career highs with 32 kickoff returns for 732 yards.

Toronto Argonauts
On February 15, 2018, Morris signed as a free agent with the Toronto Argonauts. He was released at the end of the 2018 training camp on June 11, 2018.

Ottawa Redblacks
On September 18, 2018, Morris was signed by the Ottawa Redblacks to their practice roster. He played in 16 regular season games over two seasons where he recorded 21 carries for 117 rushing yards and nine receptions for 54 receiving yards. He was released by the Redblacks on January 23, 2020.

References

External links
Ottawa Redblacks bio
Just Sports Stats

Living people
1992 births
Canadian football running backs
American football running backs
Black Canadian players of American football
Canadian Junior Football League players
New Mexico Military Institute Broncos football players
Edmonton Elks players
Ottawa Redblacks players
Players of Canadian football from Ontario
Canadian football people from Toronto
Saskatchewan Roughriders players
Toronto Argonauts players